Piazabad or Piyazabad or Piyaz Abad or Peyazabad may refer to:
 Piazabad, Ilam
 Piazabad, Markazi